Ghurur is a village in northern Aleppo Governorate, northwestern Syria.

Administratively the village belongs to Nahiya Akhtarin in A'zaz District. Nearby localities include Ziadiyah  to the west, and Tal'ar Gharbi  to the north. In the 2004 census, Ghurur had a population of 915.

References

Populated places in Azaz District
Villages in Aleppo Governorate